Marvell Wynne may refer to:
 Marvell Wynne (baseball) (born 1959), American baseball player
 Marvell Wynne (soccer) (born 1986), American soccer player and coach